The Leibniz Association (German: Leibniz-Gemeinschaft or Wissenschaftsgemeinschaft Gottfried Wilhelm Leibniz)  is a union of German non-university research institutes from various disciplines.

As of 2020, 96 non-university research institutes and service institutions for science are part of the Leibniz-Gemeinschaft. The fields range from natural science, engineering, and ecology, to economics, other social sciences, spatial science, and humanities. The Leibniz Institutes work in an interdisciplinary fashion, and connect basic and applied science. They cooperate with universities, industry, and other partners in different parts of the world. Taken together, the Leibniz Institutes employ 20,000 people and have a budget of €1.9 billion. Leibniz Institutes are funded publicly to equal parts by the federal government and the Federal states (Bundesländer). Leibniz Association was ranked 3rd in Germany and 56th across the globe.

Every Leibniz institution is evaluated by the Leibniz Senate regularly, at a minimum of once every seven years. The evaluation is used as a benchmark of quality with respect to the work and research carried out by the institutes.

History
The Leibniz-Gemeinschaft is named after the German philosopher, mathematician, scientist, and inventor Gottfried Wilhelm Leibniz (1646-1716).

The Leibniz Association evolved from the "Blaue Liste" (blue list) in former Western Germany and research institutions of the German Academy of Sciences at Berlin of the former DDR, whose research capability was deemed worth keeping after an evaluation by the German Wissenschaftsrat. The name 'Blaue Liste' for a German model for funding science has been retired, and traces back to the color of a dossier.

The Leibniz Association's headquarter is located in Berlin and there is an EU bureau in Brussels. Since 2014, the engineer Matthias Kleiner has been president of the Leibniz Association, with Christiane Neumann acting as secretary general.

Sections

A - Humanities and Educational Research

B - Economics, Social Sciences, Spatial Research

C - Life Sciences

D - Mathematics, Natural Sciences, Engineering

E - Environmental Sciences

References

External links

Homepage of the Leibniz Association, redirecting links to all of its institutes

 
Scientific organisations based in Germany